Goth Haji Salar is a neighbourhood of Keamari Town in Karachi, Sindh, Pakistan.

 
Neighbourhoods of Karachi